Blue Raider may refer to:
 Middle Tennessee State University, mascot: Blue Raider
 Lindsey Wilson College, mascot: Blue Raider
 Somerset Berkley Regional High School (Somerset, Massachusetts), mascot: Blue Raider